The Human Division is a science fiction novel by American writer John Scalzi, the fifth book set in the Old Man's War universe.

Plot synopsis
Following the events of The Last Colony, John Scalzi tells the story of the fight to maintain the unity of the human race.

The people of Earth now know that the human Colonial Union (CU) has kept them ignorant of the dangerous universe around them. For generations the CU had defended humanity against hostile aliens, deliberately keeping Earth an ignorant backwater and a source of military recruits. Now the CU's secrets are known to all. Other alien races have come on the scene and formed a new alliance against the Colonial Union called the Conclave. They have invited the people of Earth to join them. For a shaken and betrayed Earth, the choice is not obvious or easy.

Against such possibilities, managing the survival of the Colonial Union will not be easy, either. It will take diplomatic finesse and political cunning: the "B-Team" advised by Lieutenant Harry Wilson.

As the story progresses, it deals with how humanity fares in a universe filled with other sentient races and without a growing military force to clash with them.

Publication history
The book was published at e-book retailers between 15 January and 9 April 2013 as digital serials with thirteen episodes.

The episode titles with the release dates in 2013 are as follows:
 The B-Team  (15 January)
 Walk the Plank  (22 January)
 We Only Need the Heads  (29 January)
 A Voice in the Wilderness  (5 February)
 Tales From the Clarke  (12 February)
 The Back Channel  (19 February)
 The Dog King  (26 February)
 The Sound of Rebellion  (5 March)
 The Observers  (12 March)
 This Must Be the Place  (19 March)
 A Problem of Proportion  (26 March)
 The Gentle Art of Cracking Heads  (2 April)
 Earth Below, Sky Above  (9 April)

On 14 May 2013, the serial was collected into a full-length novel and supplemented with the first tale of Lieutenant Harry Wilson, After the Coup, and a short story that was not part of the serialization, Hafte Sorvalh Eats a Churro and Speaks to the Youth of Today. This short story was released at Tor.com and After The Coup can be found there as well.

Sequel
The e-book serialization was a success for Tor Books so it contracted with Scalzi to write a sequel, later titled The End of All Things that was also released serially in June 2015.

References

2013 American novels
2013 science fiction novels
American science fiction novels
Sequel novels
Old Man's War
Tor Books books